Ocydromiinae is a subfamily of hybotid flies.

Tribes

 Tribe Bicellariini Bradley, Sinclair & Cumming, 2006
 Genus Bicellaria Macquart, 1823
 Genus Hoplocyrtoma
 Genus Leptocyrtoma
 Tribe Ocydromiini
 Genus Apterodromia Oldroyd, 1949
 Genus Leptodromiella Tuomikoski, 1936
 Genus Leptodromia Sinclair & Cumming, 2000
 Genus Leptopeza Macquart, 1834
 Genus Neotrichina Sinclair & Cumming, 2000
 Genus Ocydromia Meigen, 1820
 Genus Oropezella Collin, 1926
 Tribe Oedaleini Chvála, 1983
 Genus Allanthalia Melander, 1927
 Genus Anthalia Zetterstedt, 1838
 Genus Euthyneura Macquart, 1836
 Genus Oedalea Meigen, 1820

References

A revision of the Ocydromiinae (Diptera: Empidoidea: Hybotidae) of New Zealand with descriptions of new genera and species

Hybotidae
Brachycera subfamilies
Articles containing video clips